Chwarae Teg (Welsh for "Fair Play") is a United Kingdom based charity working in Wales to support the economic development of women as well as working with businesses and organisations to develop and improve working practices.

History 
Chwarae Teg was launched by a consortium in 1992 in South Wales, and Jane Hutt, now a minister in the Welsh Government, was appointed its first director.

In 2009 Chwarae Teg launched their European Social Fund and Welsh Government sponsored project, Agile Nation (more details below). Referred to as "Chwarae Teg Agile Nation project #1", the project was completed in March 2015.

On 22 July 2015 Chwarae Teg launched another European Social Fund and Welsh Government sponsored project, "Agile Nation #2".

Activities

Agile Nation 

Launched in 2009 and completed in March 2015, the Chwarae Teg Agile Nation project aimed to promote gender equality, support the career advancement of women and contribute to a reduction in the gender pay gap. Agile Nation was a £12.5 million project funded by the European Social Fund and the Welsh Government.

The project had two training programs: Ascent (targeted at individual women) and Evolve (targeted at employers). These helped over 2,921 individual women and 504 businesses as of March 2015.

Policy 

Chwarae Teg's policy function monitors economic and workforce developments that impact on women and business across Wales and provides advice to academia, government and industry. This knowledge is used to identify areas where new targeted projects can be developed to address areas of under-representation of women in the workplace.

Membership 

Chwarae Teg is a registered charity which offers membership to individuals, businesses, organisations and institutions.

Trustees 
The trustees of Chwarae Teg are:

Sandra Busby - Chair
Jeffrey Andrews
Carol Bogue-Lloyd
Rachel Cunningham 
David Pritchard 
Susan Lane
Dr Anita Shaw 
Catherine Thomas
Alison Thorne
Christopher Warner
Sian Wiblin

Past chief executives
 Jane Hutt (1992–1999)
 Ruth Marks (1999–2005)
 Marcella Maxwell (2006–2008)
 Katy Chamberlain (2008–2012)
 Joy Kent (2013-2016)

Past chairs 
 Jane Jones
 Elan Closs Stephens CBE
 Gwenda Williams
 Jacky Tongue
 Debbie Green

References

External links 
 Homepage: cteg.org.uk
 News article - New Chwarae Teg website: cteg.org.uk
 Agile Nation Project #1 2008 - 2015 agilenation.org.uk
 Agile Nation Project #2 2015 - 2018 agilenation2.org.uk 

Charities based in Wales